Farouk Yousif (born 1955 in Baghdad) is an Arabic art critic and poet. He currently resides in London and is a writer for Al-Arab.

Works 
Yousif published his first collection of poetry, Silent Songs, in 1996. Since then he has published six other collections of poetry and five books of art criticism, including The Mask of Paintings (1996) and Biography of the Invisible (2011). He has also published six travelogues including Sleeping Paradise(2011).

He has worked with newspapers such as Al Hayat, Al-Quds Al-Arabi and An-Nahar as a critic.

Awards 

In 2006 Yousif won the Ibn Battuta award for his book Nothing Nobody.

References

20th-century Iraqi poets
Living people
1955 births
21st-century Iraqi poets
Iraqi children's writers